Adrian John Tucker (born 26 September 1976) is a Welsh former professional football goalkeeper who is currently an England national youth football teams' goalkeeping coach.
  
Tucker has previously had two spells as goalkeeper coach at Swansea City AFC (2009-2014, 2018–2019) While also holding the same position at Sunderland AFC (2015-2018) He was part of Swansea City's promotion campaign to the Premier League in 2011 and League Cup win in 2013.

Career
Born in Merthyr Tydfil, Tucker began his playing career with Torquay United. His debut came in December 1994, during an FA Cup second round replay at home to Enfield, when regular Torquay goalkeeper Ashley Bayes was sent off.

A shoulder injury spoiled Tucker's professional career. After leaving Torquay in 1995 he played in the Welsh Premier League and Welsh pyramid system for a number of years and spent 12 years working for the Football Association of Wales in their technical coaching and development department.

In October 2007, Tucker took charge of his first match for the Wales women's national football team, following the resignation of Andy Beattie, a spell which lasted 2 years until he joined Swansea City first time around in July 2009 as a goalkeeping coach under incoming manager Paulo Sousa, replacing Iñaki Bergara who had followed Roberto Martínez to Wigan Athletic. After Sousa's departure Tucker remained as part of Brendan Rodgers' backroom staff, as the Swans gained promotion to the FA Premier League. Following Rodgers' departure to Liverpool, Tucker continued in his role under Michael Laudrup where the Swans won the League Cup in 2013 and entered the Europa League. After five seasons working for Swansea City, Tucker was replaced by Sevilla goalkeeping coach Javier García on 27 June 2014.

Tucker then took up the position as the goalkeeper coach of England under-20s managed by Aidy Boothroyd and the academy goalkeeping coach/consultant at Birmingham City.

On 16 March 2015 Tucker joined Dick Advocaat's staff at Sunderland following the dismissal of Gus Poyet and helped secure Premier League survival. He has since worked under Sam Allardyce, David Moyes, Simon Grayson, and Chris Coleman. He returned to Swansea City in June 2018 as Graham Potter's goalkeeping coach. He left the club in June 2019 and joined Bristol Rovers in July 2019.

On 26 August 2021, Tucker was confirmed as a goalkeeping coach with the England National Men Teams

References

External links
Welsh Premier League Profile for Adrian Tucker

1976 births
Living people
Welsh footballers
Merthyr Tydfil F.C. players
Torquay United F.C. players
Footballers from Merthyr Tydfil
Women's national association football team managers
Swansea City A.F.C. non-playing staff
Sunderland A.F.C. non-playing staff
Association football goalkeepers
Welsh football managers
Bristol Rovers F.C. non-playing staff
Inter Cardiff F.C. players
Ebbw Vale F.C. players